Ctenophorus rufescens, commonly known as the rusty dragon or rusty-crevice dragon is a species of agamid lizard occurring in granite outcrops featuring open expanses strewn with exfoliated rock, in arid north-western South Australia, south-western Northern Territory and adjacent Western Australia.

References

Agamid lizards of Australia
rufescens
Endemic fauna of Australia
Reptiles described in 1893
Taxa named by Edward Charles Stirling
Taxa named by Amandus Heinrich Christian Zietz